A user direct access programming library (or uDAPL) defines a single set of user application program interfaces (APIs) for all Remote direct memory access (RDMA)-capable transports. The uDAPL mission is to define a transport-independent and platform-standard set of APIs that exploit RDMA capabilities, such as those present in InfiniBand, Virtual Interface Architecture (VIA), and ROI WG of Internet Engineering Task Force (IETF).

External links
https://www.openfabrics.org/downloads/dapl/documentation/uDAPL_v20.pdf
http://www.datcollaborative.org/udapl.html (obsolete, broken)
http://www.datcollaborative.org/uDAPL_doc_062102.pdf (obsolete, broken)

Programming libraries